The 2018–19 season was Hamilton's fifth consecutive season in the top flight of Scottish football since their promotion at the end of the 2013–14 season. Hamilton also competed in the League Cup and the Scottish Cup.

Summary

Season
Hamilton finished in tenth place in the Scottish Premiership for the second consecutive season and once again avoided dropping into the relegation play-off place on the final day of the season with their victory over St Johnstone. Hamilton were also eliminated in the group stage of the league cup and the fourth round of the Scottish Cup.

Management
Hamilton began the season under the management of Martin Canning who had been at the club as a player since 2008 and player-manager since 2015. On 29 January 2019, Canning departed the club by mutual consent. Two days later on 31 January, former St Mirren assistant Brian Rice was appointed as the club's new head coach.

Results and fixtures

Scottish Premiership

Scottish League Cup

Scottish Cup

Squad statistics

Appearances
As of 18 May 2019

|-
|colspan="10"|Players who left the club during the 2018–19 season
|-

|}

Team Statistics

League table

Division summary

League Cup Table

References

Hamilton Academical F.C. seasons
Hamilton Academical